Kim Bok-man ((December 3, 1934 – August 14, 2021), 11th dan, was an early pioneer of taekwondo in the 1950s and 1960s in South East Asia, particularly Vietnam, Indonesia, Philippines, Malaysia, Singapore and Hong Kong. He started martial arts training in the Korean art of taekyun in 1941 at the age of 7.  While he was a  Sergeant Major in the South Korean army, he was called to Malaysia by General Choi Hong-hi Korea's ambassador, to teach taekwondo to members of the government party in Malaysia and subsequently to develop taekwondo, particularly some of the forms created by General Choi, and another martial art called Chun Kuhn taekwondo.

Bok-Man Kim died on August 14, 2021, at the age of 86.

Ch'ang Hon Patterns 
Kim Bok-man and Woo Jae-lim helped General Choi develop 15 , or patterns, between 1962 and 1964 while Gen. Choi served as the Korean Ambassador to Malaysia. In no particular order, these  are: Chon-Ji, Dan-Gun, Do-San, Won-Hyo, Yul-Gok, Joong-Gun, Toi-Gye, Kwang-Gae, Po-Eun, Choon-Jang, Ko-Dang, Yoo-Sin, Choi-Yong, Se-Jong, and Tong-Il. In addition, Kim Bok-man has said that he additionally had some but considerably less input on five additional  – Hwa-Rang, Eui-Am, Se-Jong, Chung-Mu and Gye-Baek – bringing the total to 20. The only Ch'ang Hon patterns that Kim did not have any input or influence are Juche, Sam-Il, Yeon-Gae, Eul-Ji, Mun-Mu and Seo-San.

Books 
Kim Bok-man is the author of several books on martial arts.

Practical Taekwon-Do: Weapon Techniques. 1979: Sunlight Publishing.

Chun Kuhn Do: The Complete Wellness Art. 2002: World Chun Kuhn Do Federation. .

Taekwondo: Defense Against Weapons. 2012: YMAA Publication Center. . Selected as a Best Books Award finalist by USA Book News in 2012. This book reprints Practical Taekwon-Do: Weapon Techniques from 1979 with small changes in layout.

Taekwon-Do: Origins of the Art: Bok-man Kim's Historic Photospective (1955-2015). 2015: Moosul Publishing, LLC. . Selected as a Best Book Award finalist by USA Book News in June 2015, a finalist in the International Book Awards in May 2016, and a winner in the 2016 Beverly Hills International Book Awards

See also
Taekwondo in the Philippines

References

1934 births
2021 deaths
Martial arts school founders
Martial arts writers
South Korean male taekwondo practitioners
Korean military personnel
Taekwondo in the Philippines